Suoi Tien Park Station (Vietnamese: Ga Suối Tiên) is a future elevated Ho Chi Minh City Metro station on Line 1. Located in Suoi Tien Amusement Park, the station is planned to open in 2024.

References

Ho Chi Minh City Metro stations
Railway stations scheduled to open in 2024